The Bobby Lees are an American rock music group founded in 2018 in Woodstock, New York. The band comprises vocalist and guitarist Sam Quartin, bassist Kendall Wind, drummer Macky Bowman, and guitarist Nick Casa.

Their debut album, Beauty Pageant, was released in 2018. The album's success led to The Bobby Lees opening for The Black Lips, Shannon & the Clams, Future Islands, and the Chats. At one stop on their tour in Tulsa, Oklahoma the band's gear was stolen. The band were able to play the date using borrowed equipment from local bands.

Their 2020 record Skin Suit was produced by Jon Spencer and released via Alive Naturalsound Records. Skin Suit made the San Francisco Examiner Top 10 Albums of 2020 List and was called "a raucous ride from beginning to end" by PopMatters. In 2021, the group toured with Helmet in support of Skin Suit. They also recorded new material with producer Vance Powell in anticipation of a new album for release in 2022.

The band’s name The Bobby Lees comes from a song entitled ‘Bobby Lee’ off of the group's first LP. It is about a ghost who used to visit the vocalist.

Singer Sam Quartin has openly shared about a history of alcohol-induced schizophrenic episodes, and those experiences being the inspiration behind many of the group's lyrics.

Discography

Studio albums
 Beauty Pageant (February 2, 2018)
 Beauty Pageant Redux (2019)
 Skin Suit (July 17, 2020)
 Bellevue (October 7, 2022)

References

Garage rock groups from New York (state)
Alive Naturalsound Records artists
Musical groups established in 2018